Marlboro Township, Ohio may refer to:

Marlboro Township, Delaware County, Ohio
Marlboro Township, Stark County, Ohio

Ohio township disambiguation pages